Langley Fork Historic District is a national historic district located at Langley, Fairfax County, Virginia.  It encompasses 12 contributing buildings. They include Hickory Hill (c. 1870, 1931, 1964), the Langley Ordinary (c. 1850), the Langley Toll House (1820), Gunnell's Chapel, the Langley Friends meeting house (1853), a day school in an old church formerly converted to a residence (the Mackall House, 1858), and an Amoco service station dated to 1932.

It was listed on the National Register of Historic Places in 1982.

References

Historic districts in Fairfax County, Virginia
National Register of Historic Places in Fairfax County, Virginia
Historic districts on the National Register of Historic Places in Virginia